Erkin Doniyorov (born 9 April 1990) is an Uzbekistani judoka.

He is the bronze medallist of the 2016 Judo Grand Prix Tashkent in the -100 kg category.

References

External links
 

1990 births
Living people
Uzbekistani male judoka